This is a list of electoral results for the Electoral division of Arnhem in Northern Territory elections.

Members for Arnhem

Election results

Elections in the 1970s

 Preferences were not distributed.

Elections in the 1980s

 Preferences were not distributed.

Elections in the 1990s

|- style="background:#e9e9e9;"
! colspan="6" style="text-align:left;" |After distribution of preferences

Elections in the 2000s

The 2008 election in Arnhem was uncontested with one candidate nominating.

Elections in the 2010s

Elections in the 2020s

Notes

References

Northern Territory electoral results by district